Majuri (Major) is a military officer's rank (OF3) in Finland, senior to Kapteeni and junior to Everstiluutnantti.

History
During peacetime, a Majuri is a staff officer or battalion commander. The rank requires the completion of a senior staff officer course. It is also possible for reservists to obtain the reserve rank of Majuri. This is however, quite rare and requires active participation in national defence.

See also
 Finnish military ranks

References

Military ranks of Finland

fi:Majuri